is a Japanese politician of the Democratic Party of Japan (until its dissolution), and a member of the House of Representatives in the Diet (national legislature). He represents the First District of Oita prefecture. A native of Oita and graduate of the University of Tokyo, he ran unsuccessfully for the governorship of Oita Prefecture in 2003. In the same year, he ran for the House of Representatives as an independent and was elected for the first time.

References

External links 
 Official website in Japanese.

Members of the House of Representatives (Japan)
University of Tokyo alumni
Politicians from Ōita Prefecture
1958 births
Living people
Democratic Party of Japan politicians
21st-century Japanese politicians